The 2023 Beef. It's What's for Dinner. 300 was the 1st stock car race of the 2023 NASCAR Xfinity Series, and the 42nd iteration of the event. The race was held on Saturday, February 18, 2023, in Daytona Beach, Florida, at Daytona International Speedway, a  permanent tri-oval shaped superspeedway. The race was scheduled to be contested over 120 laps, but due to a NASCAR overtime finish, it was increased to 125 laps. Austin Hill, driving for Richard Childress Racing, would win the race after leading when the final caution came out on the last lap. This was Hill's third career NASCAR Xfinity Series win, and his first of the season. Hill would dominate the race as well, leading 39 laps. To fill out the podium, John Hunter Nemechek, driving for Joe Gibbs Racing, and Justin Allgaier, driving for JR Motorsports, would finish 2nd and 3rd, respectively.

Background 
Daytona International Speedway is one of three superspeedways to hold NASCAR races, the other two being Atlanta Motor Speedway and Talladega Superspeedway. The track's turns are banked at 31 degrees, while the front stretch, the location of the finish line, is banked at 18 degrees.

Entry list 

 (R) denotes rookie driver.
 (i) denotes a driver who is ineligible for series driver points.

Practice 
The first and only practice session was held on Friday, February 17, at 4:35 PM EST, and would last for 50 minutes.

Qualifying 
Qualifying was held on Saturday, February 18, at 11:30 AM EST. Since Daytona International Speedway is a superspeedway, the qualifying system used is a single-car, single-lap system with two rounds. In the first round, drivers have one lap to set a time. The fastest ten drivers from the first round move on to the second round. Whoever sets the fastest time in Round 2 wins the pole.

Six drivers would fail to qualify: Dexter Stacey, Josh Bilicki, Garrett Smithley, Timmy Hill, Ryan Vargas, and Alex Labbé.

Race results 
Stage 1 Laps: 30

Stage 2 Laps: 30

Stage 3 Laps: 65

Notes

Standings after the race 

Drivers' Championship standings

Note: Only the first 12 positions are included for the driver standings.

References 

NASCAR races at Daytona International Speedway
Beef. It's What's for Dinner. 300|Beef. It's What's for Dinner. 300
Beef. It's What's for Dinner. 300